Trevor John Sorbie MBE (born 13 March 1949 in Paisley, Scotland), is a British celebrity hairdresser.

Career
Born in Scotland, his parents moved south when he was aged 11. Leaving school aged 15, Sorbie started cutting hair as an apprentice to his father in Ilford in 1964. He opened his own barbers in Edmonton, North London aged 20 in 1969.

He became stylist for Vidal Sassoon in 1972, and Artistic Director in 1973. Following this he spent time as a stylist and session hairdresser at Toni & Guy and John Frieda, before opening his first salon in Stamford Street, London S.E.1, in 1977 then his second in 1979 in Covent Garden; he opened a third in Brighton in 2004. In 1986 he launched his own range of haircare products. Sorbie was hair stylist for Torvill and Dean on their Skating on Ice tour.

Sorbie, creator of the wedge haircut and a four-time British Hairdresser of the Year winner, was awarded an MBE in 2004.

Sorbie has appeared in several television programmes, and documentaries including The Wright Stuff, GMTV, This Morning, The Afternoon Show, The Salon, Mary Queen of Shops, Watchdog and Faking It, He always appears as himself, as either a stylist or a guest expert. In addition, Sorbie has also appeared in many magazine articles, including in Harper's Bazaar, Grazia, Prima, Your Hair, Woman & Home, Now Magazine, More Magazine, and Look Magazine.

Sorbie designed a range of consumer hair-care products. The products were designed using feedback from his salon clients".

Sorbie has a line of seven salons; the first "Trevor Sorbie" salon was opened in London's Covent Garden, with salons opened in turn in Brighton, Manchester, then a second London one in Hampstead. These have been joined by another London salon in Richmond, and also Bristol and Dubai.

Charity work

Sorbie has started his own charity known as "My New Hair". The charity came to be after Sorbie was involved in helping his brother's wife create a wig that looked like real hair as she battled with bone cancer.

Since starting My New Hair Trevor has given up salon work, and works full-time on the project. Sorbie also visited 10 Downing Street, and since has become involved in writing a national policy for NHS wigs. The charity recently met with MPs, and attended a parliamentary briefing during which 25 MP's were convinced - for the first time - to lobby ministers for better wig services from the NHS.

The work of the charity is to teach hairdressers to cut wigs in such a way that they look more like real hair, thus helping cancer patients who lose their hair through chemotherapy and other treatment, to feel as much like themselves as they can.

Sorbie's goal, in the long term, is to have salons with hairdressers trained to My New Hair standards nationwide and eventually to scale to an international level. The charity teaches hairdressers through seminars - for which there is a charge which goes directly into the charity - advanced skills sessions, and additionally, hairdressers are also welcomed to shadow Sorbie in one of his salons customising wigs.

The charity also works with people suffering from alopecia, and anyone else suffering from medical hair loss.

Personal life
Twice divorced, Sorbie has one daughter.

Further reading

References

External links 
Trevor Sorbie International
My New Hair: A Trevor Sorbie Charity

Scottish hairdressers
1949 births
Living people
People from Paisley, Renfrewshire
Members of the Order of the British Empire